Rich Fitzgerald (born May 8, 1959) is an American elected official who serves as the 3rd County Executive of Allegheny County. A member of the Democratic Party, he previously served as a member of Allegheny County Council from 2000 until 2011 as the District 11 representative.

Education/Early Career
Fitzgerald attended Carnegie Mellon University.

Political career

Allegheny County Council
Fitzgerald became the first County Council member for District 11 in January 2000 and held the seat through 2011. From 2004-2011, he served as the President of Council.

Allegheny County Executive 
Fitzgerald was sworn into office as County Executive on January 3, 2012.

Personal life
Fitzgerald is married to pharmacist Cathy Tomasovich. They reside in Squirrel Hill and had eight children. He has been noted for his resemblance to the actor Jeff Daniels.

References

1959 births
Living people
Politicians from Pittsburgh
Pennsylvania Democrats
2012 United States presidential electors
Carnegie Mellon University alumni
Central Catholic High School (Pittsburgh) alumni
Allegheny County (Pennsylvania) executives